The Business – the Definitive Singles Collection is a 3 disc box set by ska/pop band Madness released in 1993 (see 1993 in music). It contained all the band's singles until that point with their respective b-sides and other bonus tracks, some rare. It also includes a 52-page booklet and snippets of interviews with people associated with Madness between some tracks. The interviews date from around the time of the Keep Moving album and were conducted by John Tobler. Among those interviewed were founder member John Hasler, former manager John "Kelloggs" Kalinowski and Dave Robinson of Stiff Records.

Track listing

Disc one
(A mistake on the CD / Inlay card means that the song on the CD does not match the number on the inlay card).
"Introduction" (unlisted)
"The Prince" (2 Tone single version - alternative mix) (Thompson)
"Madness" (album version) (Campbell)
"One Step Beyond" (album version) (Campbell)
"Mistakes" (Barson, Hasler)
"Nutty Theme" (McPherson, Thompson)
"My Girl" (Barson)
"Stepping into Line" (McPherson, Bedford)
"In the Rain" (single version) (McPherson, Madness)
"Night Boat to Cairo" (Barson, McPherson)
"Deceives the Eye" (Bedford, Foreman)
"Young And The Old" (McPherson, Barson)
"Don't Quote Me On That" (Smyth, Peter Tosh)
"Baggy Trousers" (McPherson, Foreman)
"The Business" (Barson)
"Embarrassment" (single version) (Thompson, Barson) 
"Crying Shame" (Barson)
"The Return of the Los Palmas 7" (single version) (Barson, Woodgate, Bedford)
"That's The Way To Do It" (AKA "The Odd Job Man") (Foreman)
"My Girl" (Pathway demo) (Barson)
"Swan Lake" (live) (Arranged by Barson)
"Grey Day" (Barson)
"Memories" (Foreman)
"Shut Up" (album version) (McPherson, Foreman)
"A Town With No Name" (Foreman)

Disc two
"Never Ask Twice" (AKA "Airplane") (McPherson, Barson)
"It Must Be Love" (Original Single Version) (Labi Siffre)
"Shadow on the House" (Foreman)
"Cardiac Arrest" (album version) (Smash, Foreman)
"In the City" (McPherson, Smash, Barson, Foreman, Crutchfield, Inoue)
"House of Fun" (Barson, Thompson)
"Don't Look Back" (Foreman)
"Driving in My Car" (Barson)
"Terry Wogan Jingle" (Madness)
"Animal Farm" (Madness)
"Riding on My Bike" (Barson, Thompson)
"Our House" (Stretch Mix) (Smyth, Foreman)
"Walking With Mr. Wheeze" (Barson)
"Tomorrow's (Just Another Day)"  (single version) (Smyth, Foreman)
"Madness (Is All in the Mind)"  (single version) (Foreman)
"Wings of a Dove" (McPherson, Smyth)
"Behind the Eight Ball" (Madness)
"One's Second Thoughtlessness" (Thompson, Woodgate)
"The Sun and the Rain" (Barson)
"Fireball XL5" (Thompson)
"Visit to Dracstein Castle" (edited version) (Madness)
"Michael Caine" (Woodgate, Smyth)

Disc three
"If You Think There's Something" (Barson)
"One Better Day" (McPherson, Bedford)
"Guns" (McPherson)
"Victoria Gardens" (remix) (Barson, Smyth)
"Sarah" (Thompson)
"Yesterday's Men" (harmonica version) (McPherson, Foreman)
"All I Knew" (McPherson)
"It Must Be Love" (live) (Labi Siffre)
"Uncle Sam" (Thompson, Foreman)
"David Hamilton Jingle" (Madness)
"Inanity over Christmas" (Thompson, Woodgate)
"Please Don't Go" (Foreman)
"Sweetest Girl" (album version) (Green)
"Jennie (A Portrait Of)" (Thompson, Woodgate)
"Tears You Can't Hide" (Smyth)
"Call Me" (Smyth, McPherson)
"(Waiting For) The Ghost Train" (McPherson)
"One Step Beyond" (Italian version) (Campbell)
"Maybe In Another Life" (Thompson, Neal, Woodgate, Bedford)
"Seven Year Scratch" (edited version) (Madness, Campbell)
"Release Me" (Miller, Williams, Young, Harris)
"Carols on 45" (edited version) (Traditional; arranged by Madness)
"National Anthem" (Arranged by Madness)

References

External links
The Business at Discogs

1993 compilation albums
Madness (band) compilation albums
Virgin Records compilation albums